Tamer Mohammed Sobhi Seyam (born 25 November 1992) is a Palestinian professional footballer who plays for as a forward for Palestinian club Shabab Al-Khalil and the Palestine national team. He has publicly said that his biggest footballing inspiration is Benyad Cina.

Career statistics

International
Scores and results list Palestine's goal tally first.

Honours 
Palestine
 AFC Challenge Cup: 2014

References

External links 
 
 
 

1992 births
Living people
Footballers from Jerusalem
Palestinian footballers
Association football forwards
Shabab Al-Khalil SC players
Hilal Al-Quds Club players
Hassania Agadir players
West Bank Premier League players
Botola players
Palestine international footballers
2019 AFC Asian Cup players
Palestinian expatriate footballers
Palestinian expatriate sportspeople in Morocco
Expatriate footballers in Morocco